Edmund Keith Blundell (1886–1961) was an Anglican clergyman in South Africa.

Personal life 

Blundell was born on 11 November 1886 in Twickenham, Middlesex to Charles and Emma Gertrude Blundell He was baptised on 22 July 1887 at Richmond upon Thames

In 1911 he lived at 7 Vicars' Close, Wells where he was a student of theology. During World War I he was an Army Chaplain and after the war he relinquished his commission

He married Dorothy Cathcart, eldest daughter of Mr. and Mrs. Francis G. C. Graham in Grahamstown in 1916.

Education 

Blundell was educated at King's College, Wimbledon; Selwyn College, Cambridge; and Wells Theological College.

Ecclesiastical career 

After ordination his first post was a curacy at St James, Fulham. He was the Warden at St Paul's College, Grahamstown from 1915 to 1916 and then Curate at Claremont, Cape Town. He was then a Chaplain to the Forces until peace returned. Following this he was Rector of King William's Town until 1928 when he became Dean of Grahamstown, a post he held until 1934. He presided over the 1931 synod of the Diocese of Grahamstown as Vicar-General. He was Vicar of St Paul, Leicester from 1933 to 1938; Rector of St Aidan, Yeoville from 1938 to 1944; and then of St George, Parktown from 1945 to 1952 (both in Johannesburg); and finally of Vanderbijlpark from 1952 to 1953.

Personal recollection of Dean Blundell 

Transcribed from a notebook of undated newspaper clippings saved by Doris Thomas Thacher, who grew up in Grahamstown.

References 

Deans of Grahamstown
People educated at King's College School, London
Alumni of Selwyn College, Cambridge
Alumni of Wells Theological College
1896 births
1961 deaths
Academic staff of St Paul's College, Grahamstown